The Lost Daughter is a 2021 psychological drama film adapted for the screen and directed by Maggie Gyllenhaal (in her feature directorial debut) based on the 2006 novel of the same name by Elena Ferrante. The film stars Olivia Colman, Dakota Johnson, Jessie Buckley, Paul Mescal, Dagmara Domińczyk, Jack Farthing, Oliver Jackson-Cohen, with Peter Sarsgaard, and Ed Harris. Colman also serves as an executive producer.

The Lost Daughter had its world premiere at the 78th Venice International Film Festival on September 3, 2021, where Gyllenhaal won the Golden Osella Award for Best Screenplay. It began a theatrical limited release in the United States on December 17, 2021, prior to streaming on Netflix on December 31. The film was acclaimed by critics, and at the 94th Academy Awards received three nominations: Best Actress (Colman), Best Supporting Actress (Buckley), and Best Adapted Screenplay.

Plot
While on holiday in Greece, middle-aged university professor and noted translator, Leda Caruso, meets Nina, a young mother, after Nina's three-year-old daughter Elena goes momentarily missing on the beach. Leda finds Elena and returns her to Nina, who expresses her growing exhaustion and unhappiness. Elena is upset after she loses her favorite doll, which Leda has secretly taken. In flashbacks, it is revealed that young Leda also struggled with being a young mother to her two daughters, Bianca and Martha, often losing her patience and becoming withdrawn from her family.

One evening, Leda has dinner with Lyle, her holiday apartment's caretaker, who sees that she has the doll but doesn't comment on it, nor does he tell Nina. Leda later discovers Nina is having an affair with Will, who works at the beach bar, and Nina explains that her husband Toni is very controlling. The search for Elena's doll continues, with Nina even putting up flyers offering a reward for its return.

At a market, Leda buys Nina a hatpin to help hold her sunhat in place. When Nina asks Leda about her daughters, Leda becomes emotional; she reveals that she had abandoned them for three years after she became too overwhelmed, leaving them with her now ex-husband, during which time she had an affair with a fellow professor. She admits that being away from her daughters felt "amazing," and she only went back to them when she genuinely missed them. Nina learns that Leda knows about her and Will, and Will later asks Leda if they can borrow her apartment to have sex.

The next day when Nina arrives at Leda's to get the apartment keys, Leda admits to being a selfish and "unnatural" mother and warns Nina that her depression will never go. Leda also gives her Elena's doll, confessing that she took it and that she was "just playing." Nina reacts angrily and stabs Leda in the stomach with the hatpin before leaving. That night, Leda packs her bags and leaves the resort, but drives her car off the road due to the pain from her wound. She stumbles down the beach and collapses on the shoreline.

The next morning, Leda awakens on the beach and calls Bianca, who happens to be with Martha. They express their relief to hear from their mother, from whom they had not heard in several days. Leda says she is fine and then looks down to discover an orange in her hands; she peels the orange skin off "like a snake," the way she had done for her daughters when they were little.

Cast

Production
Maggie Gyllenhaal acquired the film rights to the Elena Ferrante novel in October 2018, and wrote and directed the adaptation.
The lead character, Leda, says that she is named for the woman in the W. B. Yeats poem "Leda and the Swan", which Yeats based on the Leda story of Greek mythology.

In February 2020, Olivia Colman, Jessie Buckley, Dakota Johnson and Peter Sarsgaard were cast in the film. In August, Paul Mescal was added, and in October 2020, Oliver Jackson-Cohen was cast as well, with Ed Harris, Dagmara Domińczyk, Jack Farthing and Alba Rohrwacher joining in November.

Principal photography began in Spetses, Greece, in September 2020 (from 28 September 2020 to 31 October 2020).

Release
The Lost Daughter had its world premiere at the 78th Venice International Film Festival on September 3, 2021. In August 2021, Netflix acquired distribution rights to the film in the United States and several other countries, adding more markets, including the United Kingdom, in October. The film screened at film festivals in the Telluride, Hamptons, London, Lyon Metropolis, Mill Valley, Montclair, New York, San Diego (closing night), Zurich, and Whistler Film Festival. It was released in the United States on December 17, 2021, in a limited release prior to streaming on Netflix on December 31, 2021.

Reception

At its opening night world premiere, the movie received a four-minute standing ovation from Venice Film Festival attendees in the Sala Grande.

On Rotten Tomatoes, the film holds an approval rating of 94% based on 232 reviews, with an average rating of 7.8/10. The website's critics consensus reads: "A strikingly assured debut for writer-director Maggie Gyllenhaal, The Lost Daughter unites a brilliant cast in service of a daringly ambitious story." On Metacritic, it has a weighted average score of 86 out of 100, based on reviews from 51 critics, indicating "universal acclaim".

Mick LaSalle of the San Francisco Chronicle wrote: "Still, no matter how flat The Lost Daughter can sometimes seem, there's always something to hold our attention. The movie is never great, but it's never exactly dull. There's always a reason to stick around for the next scene."

Jeannette Catsoulis of The New York Times wrote: “Equal parts troubling and affecting, Leda epitomizes a type of woman whose needs are rarely addressed in American mainstream movies. We can dislike her, but we are never permitted to revile her.” Michael Phillips of the Chicago Tribune wrote Gyllenhaal “keeps a close eye on what brings out the best in a scene, and in a story worth telling, with morally imperfect, fully dimensional, persistently human characters.”

Alissa Wilkinson of Vox wrote “The movie captures the spirit of the novel well. It’s suspenseful, but it’s not a thriller; there are elements of obsession and eroticism, but they never quite go where you expect. The end is deeply ambiguous, neither punishing nor condoning its characters’ behavior. It simply asks us to sit with them — to pay them the respect of attention, and learn something about ourselves in the process.”

Armond White gave a negative assessment in the National Review, saying the film “is so perfectly rotten that it surely reflects some twisted, deep-seated attitude held by Maggie Gyllenhaal, the actress turned director-writer, again taking to her soapbox for a politically modish statement”.

Accolades

References

External links
 
 Official screenplay

American drama films
Greek drama films
Films based on works by Elena Ferrante
Films shot in Greece
2021 drama films
Films about mother–daughter relationships
Films about parenting
2021 directorial debut films
2020s English-language films
English-language Greek films
Films set on islands
Films set on beaches
2020s feminist films
2020s American films
American independent films
2021 independent films
Independent Spirit Award for Best Film winners
Films set in Greece